Karl Peter Fazer (23 October 1934, Helsinki – 24 October 1998) was a Finnish sailor who competed in the 1964 Summer Olympics. In 1985-86, he was a crewmember on the boat Fazer Finland in the Whitbread Round the World Yacht Race.

References

1934 births
1998 deaths
Sportspeople from Helsinki
Swedish-speaking Finns
Finnish people of Swiss descent
Finnish male sailors (sport)
Olympic sailors of Finland
Sailors at the 1964 Summer Olympics – 5.5 Metre
Volvo Ocean Race sailors